Nancy Jane Kopell (born November 8, 1942, New York City) is an American mathematician and professor at Boston University. She is co-director of the Center for Computational Neuroscience and Neural Technology (CompNet). She organized and directs the Cognitive Rhythms Collaborative (CRC). Kopell received her B.A. from Cornell University in 1963 and her Ph.D. from Berkeley in 1967. She held visiting positions at the Centre National de la Recherche Scientifique in France (1970), MIT (1975, 1976–1977), and the California Institute of Technology (1976).

The focus of her research is the field of applied biomathematics and includes use of mathematical models to analyze the physiological mechanisms of brain dynamics. The techniques Kopell uses include extensions of invariant manifold theory, averaging theory, and geometric methods for singularly perturbed equations. From the peak of her career in 1990, she has contributed to over 200 published research articles in the field of biomathematics. Her current interests include topics such as: how does the brain produce its dynamics (physiological mechanisms), how do brain rhythms take part in cognition (sensory processing, attention, memory, motor control), and how can pathologies of brain dynamics help to understand symptoms of neurological diseases (Parkinson's disease, schizophrenia, epilepsy) as well as alternate states of consciousness (anesthesia). She collaborates widely with experimentalists and clinicians in order to conduct research on these topics.

Kopell is a 1990 MacArthur Fellow.

Biography

Early life and education 
Kopell was born on November 8, 1942 and grew up on Pelham Parkway in the Bronx. Her father was an accountant and her mother and older sister also majored in mathematics. In 1963, she graduated from Cornell University with a B.S. in mathematics. She then went on to earn an M.A. and Ph.D. in mathematics from the University of California, Berkeley in 1967. From a young age, she was exposed to mathematics. Her mother was a mathematics major, her father worked as an accountant, and her older sister studied math.

As a child, she had a severe eye problem which taught her how to cope with being "different." This ability to cope would help her successfully deal with feelings of marginalization she would later experience as a female scientist. She attributes her professional success to this ability as well as the support she received from mentors throughout her career. Her high school teachers encouraged her to go into the mathematics field.

During her undergraduate education at Cornell University, she registered for a mathematics honors program, and was the only female participant. She considered several majors, such as economics and chemistry, but chose to major in math. Kopell graduated from Cornell with an A.B. in 1963.

She then decided to attend graduate school in order to "find an alternative to the more traditional life her family expected for her." Kopell originally applied to programs on the East Coast and was admitted to all of them except for one; however, after being encouraged by another student, she chose to attend school on the West Coast instead. She was admitted to the University of California, Berkeley, with a fellowship and graduated with an M.A. and a Ph.D. in 1967. At Berkeley, she did well on her exams and was known as the "bright female." However, she struggled in the early stages of her dissertation work and switched supervisors to Stephen Smale. Smale suggested a problem which Kopell almost singlehandedly solved, leading to her thesis in the field of dynamical systems which catapulted her career.

Academic career 
After completing her graduate education, Kopell accepted an instructorship at the  Massachusetts Institute of Technology. There, she met collaborator Lou Howard, with whom she published several articles. She later met her husband, Gabriel Stolzenberg, at Boston University.

While Kopell did her thesis work in theoretical mathematics, she later switched to applied mathematics.

In 1969, she joined Northeastern University as faculty, becoming a full professor in 1978. In 1986, she became a professor of mathematics at Boston University and in 2009 she became the first woman at Boston University to be named a William Fairfield Warren Distinguished Professor. She was awarded a MacArthur Foundation Fellowship in 1990 for her work developing methods of dynamical systems to attack problems of applied mathematics. She is currently Director and Co-Founder of the Cognitive Rhythms Collaborative, which consists of a group of over two dozen labs, mostly in the Boston Area, working on brain dynamics and their cognitive implications. She is also Co-Director of the Center for Computational Neuroscience and Neural Technology (CompNet).

Kopell is a member of the National Academy of Sciences and the American Academy of Arts and Sciences. She was recently selected to be an honorary member of the London Mathematical Society, a distinction given to one or two mathematicians per year worldwide. She has been awarded Sloan Guggenheim, and McArthur Fellowships, and has an honorary Ph.D. from the New Jersey Institute of Technology. She has given the Weldon Memorial Prize Lecture (Oxford), the von Neumann Lecture, and the Josiah Willard Gibbs Lecture (AMS), as well as multiple other named lectureships.

Honors and memberships
 1975 Sloan Fellowship
 1984 Guggenheim Fellowship
 1990 MacArthur Fellowship
 1996 National Academy of Sciences
 1996 American Academy of Arts and Sciences
 1999 Josiah Willard Gibbs Lecture (American Mathematical Society)
 2006 Weldon Memorial Prize (Oxford)
 2007 John von Neumann Lecture (Society for Industrial and Applied Mathematics)
 2009 Fellow of the Society for Industrial and Applied Mathematics
 2011 Honorary Member of the London Mathematical Society
 2013 Jürgen Moser Lecture
 2015 Israel Brain Technologies Mathematical Neuroscience Prize
 2015 Fellow of the American Mathematical Society
 2016 Swartz Prize

Selected publications

Prestigious lectures given
 Volmer Fries Memorial Lecture at Rensselaer Polytechnic Institute 
 Mark Kac Memorial Lecture at Los Alamos National Laboratories 
 1993 University Lecture at Boston University
 Plenary Speaker at two meetings of the Society for Industrial and Applied Mathematics
 Invited Speaker at the International Congress of Mathematicians in 1983

See also
Ermentrout and Kopell Canonical Model

References

Other sources

External links

Nancy Kopell's home page at BU
Nancy Kopell's Publications
Cognitive Rhythms Collaborative
Neural Dynamics Group (NaK): Kopell lab page at BU

1942 births
Living people
Scientists from New York City
Mathematicians from New York (state)
20th-century American mathematicians
21st-century American mathematicians
American women mathematicians
American neuroscientists
Jewish neuroscientists
American women neuroscientists
Boston University faculty
Northeastern University faculty
MacArthur Fellows
Cornell University alumni
University of California, Berkeley alumni
Members of the United States National Academy of Sciences
Fellows of the American Mathematical Society
Fellows of the American Academy of Arts and Sciences
Fellows of the Society for Industrial and Applied Mathematics
20th-century women mathematicians
21st-century women mathematicians
20th-century American women
21st-century American women